Yerevan-Avia  (Yer-Avia) was a privately owned airline operating international cargo flights based from Zvartnots International Airport in Yerevan, Armenia. As of February 2010, it remains unclear if Yerevan-Avia is still active.

History
Yerevan-Avia was established in 1992 under the initiative and direct participation of the Mayor of Yerevan, Mr. Hambartsum Galstyan. It became the first cargo airline in Armenia with privately owned aircraft. From its inception, the company managed to prepare highly qualified flight crews in a short period of time, as well as, technical and engineering ground personnel trained entirely by recognized training institutions. The majority of the necessary aircraft maintenance was being performed at their home base.

Destinations
Yerevan-Avia started off with flights to CIS countries, and later on, was extended to France, Germany, Bulgaria, Italy, the Netherlands, Belgium, China, India, Zaire, Congo, Kenya, Egypt, and Australia. Its aircraft have been to more than 35 countries.

Fleet
As of August 2006, the Yerevan-Avia fleet includes:

1 Ilyushin Il-76

The company has guaranteed cargo traffic, mainly from the United Arab Emirates to CIS countries: Russia (mainly Moscow), Moldova, Georgia, Tajikistan, among others. They also sometimes flew to Europe (Germany and the Netherlands) and to Africa.

References

External links
Yerevan-Avia (now defunct)

Defunct airlines of Armenia
Airlines established in 1992
Airlines disestablished in 2009
Armenian companies established in 1992